Ion Ţuculescu (19 May 1910 – 27 July 1962) was a Romanian  expressionist and abstract oil painter, although professionally he worked as a biologist and physician. His artwork became well-known posthumously, when, in the spring of 1965, a major retrospective exhibition revealed him as one of the important post-World War II European modern artists.

Biography
Born in Craiova, into a family of intellectuals, he attended the Carol I High School in the city. In the art classes he was guided by teacher Eugen Ciolac, who taught him some of the techniques he was to use. His participation was first noted during the exhibition organized in 1925 in the reception hall of the Dolj County Administrative Palace. Although his artistic talent was becoming appreciated, Ţuculescu did not attend a higher-education art school; instead, he went to the  Faculty of Natural Sciences within the University of Bucharest, where he would graduate in 1936. In parallel, he also attended the Bucharest Medical University, graduating magna cum laude in 1939.

Between 1930 and 1934, he took several trips to Greece, Turkey, Palestine and Egypt, either together with Gala Galaction and his daughters, or with his own fiancée, Maria Fotiade (whom he married on May 5, 1935). It was during these trips that he retook to painting, being inspired by the Mediterranean landscapes.

His first personal exhibition would take place in 1938 in the Romanian Athenaeum hall of Bucharest. By 1960, Ţuculescu had taken part in several collective exhibitions, and had also displayed his works at the Official Salon (in 1941 and 1945). He had had seven personal exhibitions at the Romanian Athenaeum.

With the exception of the war period, when he was drafted into the Romanian Army as a combat medic, the practice of medicine did not take up much of his time. Biology had become his second most important interest, and he worked as a scientific researcher within the Romanian Academy. An autodidact in painting, Ţuculescu worked intensely after his second debut. Although he was continuously present in the artistic life of the time, his work found almost no response.

He died in Bucharest at the age of 52, and was buried in the Cernica monastery graveyard, in the Galaction family vault.

Art
Posthumously, his paintings would be the subject of critical acclaim, and, promoted by figures such as Petru Comarnescu, were the focus of numerous exhibitions inside Romania and abroad.

In his early years, Ţuculescu's work was marked by the influence of figurative Expressionism, gathering themes and subjects from Romanian folklore. He did not abandon their influence as he moved toward abstract expressionism, making use of decorative elements originating in the folk art of his native region, Oltenia.

References
 The Ion Ţuculescu Retrospective Exhibition
 Ion Ţuculescu presentation at Mari Români

External links

 Ion Tuculesu Gallery
 Ion Ţuculescu's paintings and profile at Craiova Art Museum

Romanian biologists
Abstract expressionist artists
Expressionist painters
University of Bucharest alumni
Carol I National College alumni
People from Craiova
Members of the Romanian Orthodox Church
1910 births
1962 deaths
20th-century Romanian painters
20th-century Romanian physicians
20th-century biologists
Burials at Cernica Monastery Cemetery